Liechtenstein's foreign economic policy has been dominated by its customs union with Switzerland (and with Austria-Hungary until World War I). This union also led to its independent membership in the European Free Trade Association (EFTA) in 1991. Unlike Switzerland however (where citizens rejected membership in a referendum), Liechtenstein is part of the European Economic Area.

Liechtenstein was admitted to the United Nations in 1990. It is not a member of most specialized agencies of the United Nations, with the exceptions of the International Telecommunication Union, the Universal Postal Union and the World Intellectual Property Organization.

Liechtenstein has resorted two times to international dispute settlement by the International Court of Justice, in the Nottebohm (Liechtenstein v. Guatemala) case against Guatemala in the 1950s and in a case concerning art property of the Liechtenstein family against Germany in 2005. It lost in both cases.

Liechtenstein maintains resident embassies in Austria, Belgium, Germany, Holy See, Switzerland and the United States, along with a number of missions to international organisations. Under a 1919 agreement between Liechtenstein and Switzerland, ambassadors of Switzerland are authorised to represent Liechtenstein in countries and in diplomatic situations unless Liechtenstein opts to send its own ambassador.

By 2017, Liechtenstein had diplomatic relations with 114 United Nations members.

Relations with individual countries

International dispute with Czechoslovakia, Czech Republic and Slovakia
The country has an international dispute with Czech Republic and Slovakia concerning the estates of its princely family in those countries. After World War II, Czechoslovakia, as it then was, acting to seize what it considered to be German possessions, expropriated the entirety of the Liechtenstein dynasty's hereditary lands and possessions in the Czech regions of Bohemia, Moravia, and Silesia. The expropriations (which were the subject of an unsuccessful court case brought by Liechtenstein in the German courts and the International Court of Justice) included over 1,600 km²   (which is ten times the size of Liechtenstein) of agricultural and forest land mostly in Moravia, also including several family castles and palaces. An offer from the Czech Republic to return the palaces and castles (without the surrounding land) was rejected by Liechtenstein.

Liechtenstein recognised and established diplomatic relations with the Czech Republic on 13 July 2009 and with Slovakia on 9 December 2009. Liechtenstein's ruling prince, Hans-Adam II, has announced that the principality will take no further legal action to recover the appropriated assets.

In February 2020, the Czech Constitutional court in Brno rejected a case made by Liechtenstein to get Czech government to change their classification of the Liechtenstein dynasty as German under the Benes Decrees. On 19 August 2020, an inter-state application under the European Convention on Human Rights was made by Liechtenstein to the European Court of Human Rights against the Czech Republic.

Bilateral relations

Membership in international organizations
UN, CE, EBRD, ECE, EEA, EFTA, IAEA, ICC, ICRM, IFRCS, Intelsat, Interpol, IOC, ITU, OPCW, OSCE, PCA, UNCTAD, UPU, WCL, WIPO, WTO

Liechtenstein was never a member of the League of Nations. Its application to join that international organisation was refused in 1920 due to its small size.

See also
 List of ambassadors to Liechtenstein
 List of diplomatic missions in Liechtenstein
 List of diplomatic missions of Liechtenstein

References